Radbod, Radbot, Ratbod, Ratpot, Redbod, Redbad, Radboud, Rapoto, or sometimes just Boddo, is a Germanic masculine given name that may refer to:

Redbad, King of the Frisians (died 719)
Radbod (prefect) (833–54), Frankish prefect
Ratbod (archbishop of Trier) (died 915)
Radboud of Utrecht (died 917), bishop
Radbot, Count of Habsburg (died 1045)
Rabodo (died 1119)
Redbad (film), 2018 Dutch film

Radboud may also refer to
Radboud University Nijmegen (formerly Catholic University Nijmegen), called after Saint Radboud
Radboud University Nijmegen Medical Centre